Berkay Candan (born May 22, 1993) is a Turkish professional basketball player for Bahçeşehir Koleji of the Basketbol Süper Ligi (BSL) and Basketball Champions League. He is 6 ft 9 in (2.06 m) tall and currently weighs 223 lb (101 kg).

External links
 Berkay Candan at fiba.com
 TBLStat.net Profile

References

1993 births
Living people
Bahçeşehir Koleji S.K. players
Bandırma B.İ.K. players
Büyükçekmece Basketbol players
Eskişehir Basket players
Fenerbahçe men's basketball players
People from Fatih
Power forwards (basketball)
Basketball players from Istanbul
TED Ankara Kolejliler players
Trabzonspor B.K. players
Turkish men's basketball players
Uşak Sportif players